James Walter "Jock" Robertson (21 February 1898 – 29 December 1970) was an English association footballer who played professionally for Gillingham. He joined the club while it was still playing non-league football and went on to set a club record for the most matches played in the Football League, making over 350 appearances.

Career
Robertson was born in Chatham and shortly after the First World War played for local team Chatham Centrals. Upon his demobilisation from the Army in November 1919 he signed for professional club Gillingham, at the time playing in the Southern League, but had to wait until the following April to make his debut for the team, which came in an away match against Southend United. He played in seven of the team's final eight matches of the season.

At the end of the 1919–20 season, the Southern League Division One was absorbed into the Football League to form the new Third Division, and Robertson played in the club's first ever Football League match against Southampton on 28 August 1920. Over the next thirteen seasons he made over 350 Football League appearances, a club record which stood for over 30 years. At the end of the 1932–33 season he left Priestfield Stadium to join non-league club Canterbury Waverley. Details of his career beyond that point are unknown. He died in Rochester in 1970.

Career statistics

References

1898 births
1970 deaths
Sportspeople from Chatham, Kent
Footballers from Kent
English footballers
Gillingham F.C. players
Canterbury Waverley F.C. players
Southern Football League players
English Football League players
Association football defenders